James Cardona Bravo (born 30 March 1967) is a Colombian former professional footballer who played as a defender.

Career
Cardona was born in Cali. He spent the main part of his career in América de Cali from 1987 through 1998, except spells in CA Bucaramanga in 1991 and Deportivo Pereira in 1992–93. In 1999 he played for both Deportes Tolima and Millonarios F.C. In 2000 he played abroad for LDU Quito, rejoining América de Cali before going abroad again with Club Olimpia in 2002. He rounded off his career with Deportes Tolima in 2003.

He was capped twice for Colombia national team in 1995, both at the 1995 Copa América, and one more time in 2000, totalling three caps.

References

1967 births
Living people
Colombian footballers
Footballers from Cali
Association football defenders
Colombia international footballers
1995 Copa América players
América de Cali footballers
Atlético Bucaramanga footballers
Deportivo Pereira footballers
Millonarios F.C. players
Deportes Tolima footballers
L.D.U. Quito footballers
Club Olimpia footballers
Colombian expatriate footballers
Colombian expatriate sportspeople in Ecuador
Expatriate footballers in Ecuador
Colombian expatriate sportspeople in Paraguay
Expatriate footballers in Paraguay